

Introduction 
The Cascade Volcanic Arc is a chain of volcanoes stretching from southern British Columbia down to northern California. Within the arc there is a variety of stratovolcanoes like Mount Rainier and broad shield volcanoes like Medicine Lake. But calderas are very rare in the Cascades, with very few forming over the 39 million year lifespan of the arc. The few eruptions that do form calderas rarely make it into the VEI 7 range, staying confined to the VEI 6 range in most cases. The only volcanoes known to have produced eruptions within the VEI 7 range are Crater Lake, the Mt. Baker Volcanic Field, and the Lassen Volcanic Center.

All of the exceptionally large caldera-forming eruptions within the cascades erupted silica-rich magmas, with the three VEI 7s erupting mainly rhyodacite and rhyolite.

List of calderas

Places where calderas could be 
These are places that have experienced very large eruptions of ash and ignimbrite that reached a VEI of 6 or greater, but have no documented calderas.

Tumalo Volcanic Center 
The Tumalo Volcanic Center is a volcano located just east of Bend, Oregon. It started producing large eruptions around 650,000 years ago, with its first eruption reaching a 5 on the VEI scale and erupting more than 1 km3 of magma. The volcano would go on to produce at least three more voluminous eruptions. The two largest eruptions ejected more than 5 km3 of magma. Eruptions of those sizes usually entail caldera collapses. However no calderas have been identified in this area.

Deschutes Formation 
Between 6.25 to 5.45 million years ago the cascade volcanic arc flared up in activity. Producing far more explosive ignimbrite eruptions than usual. The activity was mostly focused within the central Oregon cascades. Over 78 individual eruptions have been identified and the total volume of pyroclastic products in the Deschutes formation is estimated to be between 400 and 675 km3.

References 

 
Volcanoes